Dojo nabe (Japanese: 泥鰌鍋 or ドジョウ鍋; dojō nabe) is a Japanese nabemono dish. To prepare the dish, pond loaches are cooked in a hot pot. The freshwater fishes are either killed ahead of cooking or are first soaked in cold sake and then cooked alive.

See also 
 Chueo-tang, Korean pond loach soup
 Ikizukuri, the preparation of sashimi from living animals
 Odori ebi, shrimp eaten alive in Japanese cuisine
 Drunken shrimp, shrimp eaten alive in Chinese cuisine
 Sannakji, octopus eaten alive in Korean cuisine
 Yin Yang fish, partially deep-fried fish eaten alive in mainland China and Taiwanese cuisine
 Odorigui

References

External links 
 ドジョウ鍋 – YouTube

Japanese soups and stews
Fish dishes